The 1999–2000 Detroit Red Wings season was Detroit's 74th season of operation in the National Hockey League.

Off-season

Regular season
The Red Wings led in goals for during the regular season, with 278. They also finished first in power-play goals scored, with 69 (tied with the Philadelphia Flyers) and power-play percentage (20.41%).

Final standings

Schedule and results

Playoffs

Western Conference Quarterfinals

(4) Detroit Red Wings vs. (5) Los Angeles Kings

Western Conference semifinals

(3) Colorado Avalanche vs. (4) Detroit Red Wings

Player statistics

Skaters

Goaltending

† Denotes player spent time with another team before joining the Red Wings. Stats reflect time with the Red Wings only.

Note: GP = Games played; G = Goals; A = Assists; Pts = Points; +/- = Plus/minus; PIM = Penalty minutes;
      GS = Games started; TOI = Time on ice; W = Wins; L = Losses; T = Ties; GA = Goals against; GAA = Goals-against average; SO = Shutouts; SA = Shots against; SV% = Save percentage;

Awards and records

Transactions

Draft picks
Detroit's draft picks at the 1999 NHL Entry Draft held at the FleetCenter in Boston, Massachusetts.

See also
1999–2000 NHL season

References

Detroit
Detroit
Detroit Red Wings seasons
Detroit Red Wings
Detroit Red Wings